Barati may refer to:

People
 Bijan Barati (born 1997), Iranian volleyball player
 George Barati  (1913) a Hungarian cellist, composer, and conductor
 Éva Barati (born 1968 in Üröm) is a Hungarian athlete 
 Kristóf Baráti (born 1979) is a Hungarian classical violinist
 Reza Barati (1988–2014), Kurdish Iranian asylum seeker murdered in Australia's Manus Regional Processing Centre

Others
 Barati (1954 film), 1954 Indian film
 Barați, a village in Mărgineni, Bacău, Romania

See also 
 
 Baratie (disambiguation)
 Bharati (disambiguation)
 Baratti (disambiguation)
 Barate
 Barat (disambiguation)
 Bharat (disambiguation)

Hungarian-language surnames
Italian-language surnames
Iranian-language surnames